Agrotis viettei is a moth of the family Noctuidae. It is found in Réunion.

References

Agrotis
Moths described in 2003
Moths of Africa